Cường Để (born Nguyễn Phước Dân; 11 January 1882 - 5 April 1951) was an early 20th-century Vietnamese revolutionary who, along with Phan Bội Châu, unsuccessfully tried to liberate Vietnam from French colonial occupation.

Cường Để was a royal relative of the Nguyễn dynasty and, according to the rule of primogeniture, was the heir of the dynasty, directly issued from the line of first-born descendants of Emperor Gia Long and his son Prince Cảnh. He was officially an "external marquis" (Ky Ngoai Hau).

Study in Japan

Prince Cường Để went in secret to Japan at the end of 1905, leaving a pregnant wife and two young sons in Indochina. He attended a military academy in the Kanda district of Tokyo, followed by Waseda University, where he learned to speak perfect, accentless Japanese. He also married a Japanese woman. While in Japan, he supported and became the figurehead for the Phong Trao Dong Du ("On the Way to the East" movement), led by the revolutionary Phan Bội Châu in support of Indochinese independence from France. The organization was encouraged by the victory of Japan over Russia in the Russo-Japanese War, and received financial support from Sun Yat-sen, Liang Qichao as well as Inukai Tsuyoshi and Kashiwabara Buntaro. Between 1905 and 1910, it sponsored some 200 Vietnamese to study in Japan.

However, after the Franco-Japanese Treaty of 1907, French colonial authorities applied diplomatic pressure against Japan to suppress the organization and many of its members were deported by 1910.

Prince Cường Để made a trip to Siam from November 1908-March 1909, returning to Japan in May 1909. However, his presence in Japan was reported by the French government to the Japanese, who issued a warrant for his arrest. He hid until September, at one point escaping out a hotel window in Kobe as the police came in through the door. However, he was finally deported to Shanghai at the end of October.

Interwar period

Prince Cường Để then went to Beijing, where the Chinese warlord Duan Qirui offered financial support if he would start an uprising against the French in Indochina as leader of the 1911 Vietnam Restoration Organisation (Việt Nam Quang Phục Hội). He traveled to Hong Kong and then to Bangkok in 1911, but was apprehended by Siamese authorities and deported back to China. He then traveled via Singapore to Europe, visiting Berlin and London. However, in 1913, he was sentenced to death in absentia as the French started to suppress pro-independence agitation more harshly.

Returning to Japan, Prince Cường Để found help from the Pan-Asian movement, including Tōyama Mitsuru and was given a monthly allowance by his old friend Inukai Tsuyoshi. However, he was devastated by the news of the arrest of Phan Bội Châu in Shanghai in 1925, followed by the assassination of Inukai in 1932.  Prince Cường founded the Phuc Quoc (Việt Nam Phục quốc Đồng minh Hội, "League for the Restoration of Vietnam") in 1938, which also had an armed wing, as a monarchist alternative to the Viet Minh (Việt Nam Độc lập Đồng minh Hội, "League for the Independence of Vietnam") movement created by Ho Chi Minh. He approached the Japanese military, hoping to be restored to the throne in Vietnam as Puyi had been restored to the throne in Manchukuo.

Under Japanese rule

Prince Cường Để lived in Taiwan from 1939 to May 1940, where he produced a daily four-hour radio show. Later that year, the Japanese invasion of French Indochina occurred, but left the Vichy French colonial administration intact in order to maintain stable conditions to obtain essential war materials. However, Prince Cường Để remained loyal to the concept of the Greater East Asia Co-Prosperity Sphere and made contact with leaders of the Cao Đài movement who were interested in a monarchy led by Prince Cường Để. Following the collapse of the Vichy French government, the Japanese staged a coup de main, creating the independent Empire of Vietnam. Prince Cường Để brought forth a five-member provisional government, which was sponsored by the IJA 38th Army; however, Tokyo made the surprising decision to retain Emperor Bảo Đại as nominal head of state, and Prince Cường Để's efforts to return as ruler of Vietnam were frustrated.

Final years

Following the end of World War II, Prince Cường Để became a Japanese citizen, taking the name of Masao Ando. He gave a press conference in August 1949, vowing to return to Vietnam to oppose Bảo Đại, should Bảo Đại sign agreements granting France colonial rights in Vietnam again. However, as a Japanese subject, he was not permitted a Vietnamese passport. His attempts to return to Vietnam via Thailand and via Hong Kong disguised as a Chinese with a fake passport were foiled in 1950. Prince Cường Để died of cancer in 1951 at the Nippon Medical School Hospital in Tokyo.

References

External links
 Phan Bội Châu and the Dông-Du Movement edited by Vinh Sinh of Yale University (PDF).

1882 births
1951 deaths
Vietnamese nationalists
Vietnamese revolutionaries
Nguyen dynasty princes
Pretenders to the Vietnamese throne
Việt Nam Quang Phục Hội politicians
Place of birth missing
Vietnamese monarchists
Vietnamese anti-communists
Vietnamese emigrants to Japan
Waseda University alumni
Vietnamese collaborators with Imperial Japan
Naturalized citizens of Japan